Megan Cavanagh (born November 8, 1960) is an American actress, who is best known for portraying Marla Hooch in A League of Their Own and the voice of Judy Neutron in Jimmy Neutron: Boy Genius and The Adventures of Jimmy Neutron, Boy Genius.

Early life and education
Cavanagh was born November 8, 1960, in Chicago, the daughter of Jim and Rita. Raised in River Forest along with her four siblings, Cavanagh went to Oak Park and River Forest High School, graduating at 16 in 1977. She attended Rosary College in River Forest (now Dominican University), graduating in January 1982.

Career

Film
Cavanagh made her film debut in Penny Marshall's A League of Their Own starring Tom Hanks, Geena Davis, and Lori Petty. Film critic Vincent Canby of the New York Times praised the film writing ""A League of Their Own" is one of the year's most cheerful, most relaxed, most easily enjoyable comedies. It's a serious film that's lighter than air, a very funny movie that manages to score a few points for feminism in passing."  He went on to list Cavanagh as among "the excellent supporting players", as did film critic Jonathan Rosenbaum of the Chicago Reader.

Following her film debut, Cavanagh was cast in two Mel Brooks' comedies. The supporting roles were Broomhilde in Robin Hood: Men in Tights (1993) and Essie in Dracula: Dead and Loving It (1995). Other films include supporting roles in For Richer or Poorer (1997) starring Tim Allen, Kirstie Alley, and Jay O. Sanders, and Disney's That Darn Cat starring Christina Ricci and Doug E. Doug.

She voiced Judy Neutron and Sasha Vortex in the 2001 Oscar-nominated animated feature Jimmy Neutron: Boy Genius.

TV
Cavanagh was featured in the short-lived second season of Bob (1993) and played the recurring role of Trudy McHale, who married Al Borland in the series finale, on the sitcom Home Improvement starring Tim Allen, Patricia Richardson and Earl Hindman (1998–99).

Openly lesbian, Cavanagh starred in Exes and Ohs, a lesbian comedy on Logo TV.

She reprised the role of Judy Neutron in The Adventures of Jimmy Neutron, Boy Genius and several TV movies including The Jimmy Timmy Power Hour, Jimmy Neutron: Win, Lose and Kaboom, The Jimmy Timmy Power Hour 2: When Nerds Collide and The Jimmy Timmy Power Hour 3: The Jerkinators. She also voiced Slog in Tak and the Power of Juju and Hilary Higgenbottom in The Mighty B!.

She appears in the American sitcom Friends as Luisa the ex-classmate of Rachel (Jennifer Aniston) and Monica (Courteney Cox) who works for animal control. She is only in one episode.

Cavanagh makes an appearance in Season 3, Episode 4 of Will and Grace entitled "Girl Trouble." She plays Terry.

Stage
Cavanagh returned to the stage in 2004 as Earth Mother in Menopause: The Musical. Theater critic Patricia Reardon wrote, "...you won't find a funnier, more satisfying way to spend an evening than with the four rollicking ladies of Menopause The Musical."

In 2009, Cavanagh performed the medium Madame Arcati in High Spirits, a musical with a book, lyrics, and music by Hugh Martin and Timothy Gray, based on the play Blithe Spirit by Noël Coward.  42nd Street Moon's production was staged at the Eureka Theatre, 215 Jackson St in San Francisco, and was well received.  San Francisco theater critic Chad Jones writes, "On Broadway, [Angela] Lansbury is said to be divine in the role, but 42nd Street Moon has a real secret weapon here: Megan Cavanagh,...Cavanagh is hilarious and heartfelt."

Chicago
Cavanagh was an original member (1984–1987) of the professional theatre troupe New Age Vaudeville (formerly the Comedy Cabaret) founded by Richard O'Donnell and Amy McKenzie. An Actor's Equity (AEA) theatre troupe, the Comedy Cabaret landed a summer residence at Peninsula Players in Fish Creek, Wisconsin, where it developed works for a predominantly tourist trade and then relocated to their winter home in Chicago at CrossCurrents. Throughout her tenure, Megan Cavanagh (who thus earned her Actors' Equity union card) starred in numerous productions including the cult-hits An Evening with Elmore & Gwendolyn Putts - The Neighbors Next Door and The TV Dinner Hour (the latter featured IO Theater founder Del Close). Rick Kogan of the Chicago Tribune'' hailed both productions as "Among the most polished and clever productions of the season, a pair of devilishly inventive and challenging shows that won over critics and audiences".

Filmography

Film

Television

Video games

References

External links
 
 

1960 births
Living people
American film actresses
American television actresses
American voice actresses
Actresses from Chicago
American lesbian actresses
Dominican University (Illinois) alumni
LGBT people from Illinois